José H. Leal is a Brazilian-born malacologist residing in the United States since 1984. Between 1996 and 2013 he was the executive director of the Bailey-Matthews National Shell Museum, in Sanibel Island, Florida, and he is currently the science director and curator of that museum.

Leal received his Ph.D. in marine biology and fisheries from the Rosenstiel School of Marine and Atmospheric Science, University of Miami. He was an assistant editor for Sea Frontiers Magazine, (Miami), a visiting professor at the Muséum National d'Histoire Naturelle (Paris), and postdoctoral fellow at the Smithsonian Institution's National Museum of Natural History (Washington, DC).

Leal holds honorary faculty positions at the University of Miami and Florida Gulf Coast University (Fort Myers), where he is an affiliate member of the Coastal Watershed Institute. He has numerous scientific publications, and is also the editor of the malacological journal The Nautilus. He has been president of the American Malacological Society and of Conchologists of America.

Taxa
Taxa named in honor of José H. Leal include:
 Epitonium leali Garcia, 2011 
 Tritonoharpa leali Harasewych, Petit, & Verhecken, 1992
 Dermomurex leali Houart, 1991

References

 Bailey-Matthews Shell Museum Museum entry on Dr. Leal
 Ft Myers Magazine interview
 WeekAway.com interview about a new exhibit
 Times of the Islands.com profile
 Museum of the Earth interview about the Gulf oil spill

Brazilian malacologists
Brazilian zoologists
Living people
Federal University of Rio de Janeiro alumni
People from Rio de Janeiro (city)
Year of birth missing (living people)